USS Ellington (SP-776) was a United States Navy patrol vessel in commission from 1917 to 1919.

Ellington was built as a civilian motor launch of the same name in 1915 for the Bureau of Immigration. In 1917, she was transferred to the U.S. Navy for use as a section patrol boat during World War I. She was commissioned on 22 May 1917 as USS Ellington (SP-776).

Assigned to the 12th Naval District, Ellington performed harbor patrol and guard ship duty in the San Pedro, Los Angeles, area for the rest of World War I.

Ellington was transferred back to the Bureau of Immigration on 26 February 1919.

References

SP-776 Ellington at Department of the Navy Naval History and Heritage Command Online Library of Selected Images: U.S. Navy Ships -- Listed by Hull Number "SP" #s and "ID" #s -- World War I Era Patrol Vessels and other Acquired Ships and Craft numbered from SP-700 through SP-799
NavSource Online: Section Patrol Craft Photo Archive Ellington (SP 776)

Patrol vessels of the United States Navy
World War I patrol vessels of the United States
1915 ships